For the area in Sumatra see Musi Rawas Regency

Rawas is a village in Southwest Papua, Indonesia. The village is located in the central part of the Bird's Head Peninsula.
A dirt road connects it to Greemakolo in the southwest.

References

Populated places in Southwest Papua